= Dajković =

Dajković (Serbian: Дајковић, Romanian: Daicovici) is a Montenegrin surname. Notable people with the surname include:

- Danilo Dajković, Orthodox Vladika of Montenegro (1961–1990)
